Anaya Tumhari Hui is a 2015 Pakistani family drama serial, produced by Asif Raza Mir and Babar Javed under their production banner A&B Entertainment, directed by Wajahat Hussain. It features Sami Khan, Rabab Hashim, Rabia Noreen, Naila Jaffri, and Hassan Niazi in prominent roles.

Plot
The series explores the story of Anaya (Rabab Hashim). She is gentle, kind, and a pure soul who considers her life as a fairy-tale. Anaya is submissive and reticent by nature. She is the sister of 2 brothers and only daughter of wealthy doting parents. She was engaged to her cousin Saarim (Sami Khan) who lived in the U.S with his mother (Rabia Noreen). Saarim’s mother, who is also Anaya’s aunt thought that once he’ll marry Anaya, her niece, Saarim’s greedy, irresponsible, and carefree attitude will be settled. Just because of Anaya’s pure nature, she unconditionally falls in love with Saarim. She builds the image of Saarim as a perfect husband in her mind and dreamt about him. Whereas Saarim has no feelings and respect for Anaya and her family.

Cast
Rabab Hashim as Anaya (appeared in episodes 1-23)
Sami Khan as Saarim (appeared in episodes 1-13)
Hassan Niazi as Sheharyaar (appeared in episodes 14-23)
Naila Jaffri as Safia; Anaya's mother (appeared in episodes 1-23)
Rabia Noreen as Samina; Saarim's mother (appeared in episodes 1-13)
Azekah Daniel as Mirha; Anaya's friend (appeared in episodes 1-23)
Omer Shahzad as Jawad; Anaya's brother (appeared in episodes 1-23)
Asad Siddiqui as Behzad; Anaya's brother (appeared in episodes 1-23)
 Anwar Iqbal as Ejaz Ahmed; Anaya's father (appeared in episodes 1-16)
Sarah Omair as Samra; Jawad's wife (appeared in episodes 1-23)
Beena Chaudhary as Samra's mother (appeared in episodes 1-23)
Noshaba Javed as Sadia; Sheharyaar and Mirha's mother (appeared in episodes 6-23)
Shehzad Mukhtar as Ahmed; Sheharyaar and Mirha's father (appeared in episodes 6-23)
Zainab Ahmed as Priya; Indian-American girlfriend of Saarim (appeared in episodes 7-11,13)

Guest Appearance
Farah Nadeem as Hajra; childhood friend of Safia (appeared in episode 20 and 21).
Danial Afzal Khan as Sameer; rascal son of Hajra who tried to kidnap Anaya (appeared in episode 20, 21, and 23).
Akhtar Ghazali as Dr.Shehzad; Pakistani-American friend of Ejaz Ahmed (appeared in episode 10 and 23).
Khwaja Saleem as Palmist (appeared in first episode).

Production

Casting
The serial marks the second appearance of Rabab Hashim and Sami Khan after their joint appearance in Piya Mann Bhaye. Sami Khan was cast to portray the negative character of "Saarim", and along with him, Sarah Omair also portrays the antagonist character "Samra".

Release
It was released on "Geo Entertainment" originally, airing episodes twice a week i.e, Wednesday and Thursday. Subsequently, it had a re-run on the channel and was aired on sister channel Geo Kahani as well. In 2019, the serial released on the YouTube channel of Geo Kahani and since then it became available to stream digitally.

References

Pakistani television series
Urdu-language television shows
Geo TV original programming
2015 Pakistani television series debuts
Pakistani romance television series